Young Ramsay was an Australian television drama series which ran from 1977 to 1980 on the Seven Network. It was produced by Crawford Productions as two series of 13 episodes each.

Cast
 John Hargreaves as Peter Ramsay
 Serge Lazareff as Ray Turner
 Barbara Llewellyn as Julie Lambert (series one only)
 Louise Howitt as Cassie McCallum (series two only)
 Vic Gordon as Jack Lambert (series one only)
 John Howard as Bob Scott (series two only)

Guest stars
 Colleen Hewett
 Sigrid Thornton
 Judith McGrath
 Ruth Cracknell
 Syd Heylen
 Terry Norris
 Briony Behets
 Brian Blain
 Max Cullen
 Monica Maughan
 Ron Graham
 Sam Neill
 Bill Hunter
 Roger Ward
 Jonathan Hardy

References

External links
 
 http://www.tv.com/young-ramsay/show/16446/summary.html

Australian drama television series
Television shows set in Victoria (Australia)
1977 Australian television series debuts
1980 Australian television series endings
Seven Network original programming